Kang Min-ho (Hangul: 강민호; born August 18, 1985) is a South Korean catcher who plays for the Samsung Lions in the Korea Baseball Organization. He previously played with the Lotte Giants. At the conclusion of the 2017 season, he left the Giants to join the Samsung Lions.

Amateur career 
Kang attended Pocheol Technical High School in Pohang. In 2003, he was selected for the South Korea national junior team and competed in the 5th Asian Junior Baseball Championship held in Bangkok, Thailand. As a starting catcher, Kang helped South Korea win their second Championship title.

Notable international appearances

Professional career

Lotte Giants 
After graduation from high school, Kang made his pro debut in 2004, drafted by the Lotte Giants in the 2nd round  (3rd pick, 17th overall) of the 2004 KBO draft.

In the 2006 KBO season, he became a starting catcher, appearing in all 126 regular season games. Kang was the youngest starting catcher to play all regular season games in the KBO history.

Kang offensively broke out in the 2008 season. He finished 19th in batting average (.292), 5th in home runs (19) and 6th in RBI (82), and led the Giants to their first post-season appearance since 2000. He won his first Golden Glove Award. Kang was the first catcher of all time to win a Golden Glove Award as a Giants catcher.

Samsung Lions 
At the end of the 2017 season, Kang signed a contract to join the Samsung Lions. The four-year contract was valued at ₩8 billion  (~US$7.3 million).

International career 
Kang participated in the 2008 Olympic Games held in Beijing, China, selected for the South Korea national baseball team, where he served as backup to Jin Kab-Yong. However, Jin was injured during a game against the Netherlands, and Kang took over as the starting catcher at the next game. He did a successful job for replacing an injured Jin Kab-Yong during the rest of the competition and eventually leading South Korea to the gold medal.

Notable international appearances

Awards and honors 
2008  KBO Golden Glove Award (Catcher)
2011 KBO Golden Glove Award (Catcher)
2012 KBO Golden Glove Award (Catcher)
2013 KBO Golden Glove Award (Catcher)
2017 KBO Golden Glove Award (Catcher)

References

External links 
 Profile and stats on the KBO official website

1985 births
2009 World Baseball Classic players
2013 World Baseball Classic players
2015 WBSC Premier12 players
Asian Games medalists in baseball
Baseball players at the 2006 Asian Games
Baseball players at the 2008 Summer Olympics
Baseball players at the 2010 Asian Games
Baseball players at the 2014 Asian Games
Baseball players at the 2020 Summer Olympics
KBO League catchers
Living people
Lotte Giants players
Samsung Lions players
Medalists at the 2006 Asian Games
Medalists at the 2008 Summer Olympics
Medalists at the 2010 Asian Games
Medalists at the 2014 Asian Games
Olympic medalists in baseball
Olympic gold medalists for South Korea
Olympic baseball players of South Korea
Sportspeople from Jeju Province
South Korean baseball players
Sportspeople from Busan
Asian Games gold medalists for South Korea
Asian Games bronze medalists for South Korea